Visitors to Tajikistan must obtain a visa from one of the Tajikistan diplomatic missions unless they come from one of the visa exempt countries or countries whose citizens are eligible for an electronic visa.

Visa policy map

Visa exemption
Tajikistan introduced an unilateral 30-day visa waiver for 53 countries on 1 January 2022. Consequently, citizens of the following 62 countries can enter Tajikistan without a visa for stays up to the duration listed below:

Nationals of China holding a passport endorsed "for public affairs" do not require a visa for a maximum stay of 30 days.

Holders of diplomatic or official/service passports of Brunei, China, Hungary, India, Iran, North Korea, Pakistan, Romania, South Korea, Turkey and holders of diplomatic passports only of Afghanistan, Turkmenistan and Uzbekistan do not require a visa for Tajikistan.

Visa waiver agreement for diplomatic passports was signed with Jordan in 2017 and it is yet to come into force.

Visa on arrival
Nationals of the following countries may obtain a visa on arrival at Dushanbe International Airport, for a maximum stay of up to 45 days:

eVisa
Tajikistan launched an eVisa system on 1 June 2016. The eVisa can be used at any border crossing, and is granted for tourism and business. Along with an eVisa visitors may obtain a permit to visit the Gorno-Badakhshan Autonomous Region for US$20.

Holders of passports of the following 120 countries or territories can obtain a single or multiple entry eVisa online for US$30  prior to arrival for a maximum stay of 60 days within 90 days:

Stateless persons who were citizens of Tajikistan can also obtain an eVisa.

Online visa application  
Nationals of any country may apply for a regular visa online. If the visa application is successful, the visa can be collected either in one of the diplomatic missions of Tajikistan around the world, or on arrival at Dushanbe International Airport.

Gorno-Badakhshan

Special permits are required to visit the regions within the Gorno-Badakhshan Autonomous Province. OVIR permit required (15+5 Tajikistani Somoni) and another special permit (free of charge) is required for Lake Sarez.

Admission refused or confirmation required 

 
 
  DPR
  
  LPR
 
  SADR

Statistics

By country

See also

Visa requirements for Tajik citizens

References

External links
 Tajikistan E-visa application

Government of Tajikistan
Foreign relations of Tajikistan
Tajikistan